Parachartergus is a genus of epiponine social wasps belonging to the subfamily Polistinae. Species include:
Parachartergus amazonensis
Parachartergus apicalis - known to form mutualistic relationships with treehoppers. The male genitalia are noted for their movements of "startling complexity".
Parachartergus aztecus
Parachartergus colobopterus - unusually nests contain several queens. The species is docile, preferring to leave the nest than mount an attack.
Parachartergus griseus (Fox, 1898)
Parachartergus fasciipennis (Ducke, 1905)
Parachartergus flavofasciatus
Parachartergus fraternus (Gribodo, 1892) - closely related to P. apicalis and has been studied extensively
Parachartergus fulgidipennis
Parachartergus griseus
Parachartergus lenkoi
Parachartergus pseudoapicalis
Parachartergus richardsi (Willink, 1951)
Parachartergus smithii
Parachartergus tomentus
Parachartergus weyrauchi
Parachartergus wagneri

References

Vespidae